Rogério Dezorzi (born 12 August 1966) is a Brazilian boxer. He competed at the 1992 Summer Olympics and the 1996 Summer Olympics. In the tournament, he defeated Steven Kevi of Papua New Guinea in the first round, before being beaten by Ramazan Palyani of the Unified Team in the next round.

References

External links
 

1966 births
Living people
Brazilian male boxers
Olympic boxers of Brazil
Boxers at the 1992 Summer Olympics
Boxers at the 1996 Summer Olympics
Sportspeople from São Paulo
Featherweight boxers
Pan American Games medalists in boxing
Medalists at the 1991 Pan American Games
Pan American Games bronze medalists for Brazil
Boxers at the 1991 Pan American Games
20th-century Brazilian people
21st-century Brazilian people